Mingus Plays Piano is a 1964 solo jazz album by Charles Mingus. The album is notable for Mingus's departure from his usual role as composer and double-bassist in ensemble recordings, instead playing piano without any additional musicians.

Track listing 
"Myself When I Am Real" – 7:38
"I Can't Get Started" (Vernon Duke, Ira Gershwin) – 3:43
"Body and Soul" (Frank Eyton, Johnny Green, Edward Heyman, Robert Sour) – 4:35
"Roland Kirk's Message" – 2:43
"Memories of You" (Eubie Blake, Andy Razaf) – 4:37
"She's Just Miss Popular Hybrid" - 3:11
"Orange Was the Color of Her Dress, Then Silk Blue" – 4:18
"Meditations for Moses" - 3:38
"Old Portrait" - 3:49
"I'm Getting Sentimental Over You" (George Bassman, Ned Washington) – 3:46
Compositional Theme Story: "Medleys, Anthems and Folklore" – 8:35

All music composed by Charles Mingus unless otherwise noted.

Personnel 
Charles Mingus - piano, vocals

Production 
Bob Thiele - producer, photography
Michael Cuscuna - reissue producer
Bob Simpson - engineer
Erick Labson - digital remastering
Nat Hentoff - liner notes
Victor Kalin - cover painting
Hollis King - art direction, design
Joe Lebow - liner design
Lee Tanner - photography

References

Charles Mingus albums
1964 albums
Impulse! Records albums
Albums produced by Bob Thiele
Solo piano jazz albums